Dinner at Deviant's Palace is a novel by Tim Powers published in 1985.

Plot summary
Dinner at Deviant's Palace is a novel in which Rivas rescues members from a cult in post holocaust America.

Reception
Dave Langford reviewed Dinner at Deviant's Palace for White Dwarf #92, and stated that "Sizzling entertainment: but the sudden triumph over alien omnipotence doesn't quite convince."

Reviews
Review by Faren Miller (1984) in Locus, #286 November 1984
Review by Pascal J. Thomas (1985) in Fantasy Review, March 1985
Review by Baird Searles (1985) in Isaac Asimov's Science Fiction Magazine, April 1985
Review by Doc Kennedy (1985) in Rod Serling's The Twilight Zone Magazine, May-June 1985
Review by Tom Easton (1985) in Analog Science Fiction/Science Fact, June 1985
Review by Robert Coulson (1985) in Amazing Stories, July 1985
Review by Algis Budrys (1985) in The Magazine of Fantasy & Science Fiction, July 1985
Review by Martyn Taylor (1986) in Vector 132

References

1985 American novels
1985 science fiction novels
Ace Books books
American post-apocalyptic novels